Mary Francesca Bosworth is an Australian criminologist who is interested in imprisonment, race, and gender. She is the author of a number of books, including Engendering Resistance: Agency and Power in Women’s Prisons (1999), Explaining U.S. Imprisonment (2010), (with Carolyn Hoyle) the edited book What is Criminology? (2011), (with Katja Aas) the edited book The Borders of Punishment (2013) and Inside Immigration Detention (2014).  Mary Bosworth is UK Editor-in-Chief of the journal Theoretical Criminology.

Life

Bosworth studied arts at the University of Western Australia.
She then attended  the University of Cambridge where she gained an MPhil and a doctoral degree in criminology. 
She worked in the United States for eight years, returning to the United Kingdom in 2004.
She is currently Professor of Criminology and Fellow of St Cross College at the University of Oxford in England as well as Professor in the school of Social Sciences at Monash University in Melbourne, Australia. In addition, Bosworth is Director of the Centre for Criminology at the University of Oxford.

Work
Bosworth has published a number of papers and books on race, gender and citizenship, particularly on prisons and immigration detention.
Her research is international and comparative. She has worked in Paris, Britain, the USA and Australia. 
In all her work Bosworth examines how individuals negotiate the institutional constraints of their confinement and how that confinement reinforces and is reinforced by their prior experience of poverty, violence and abuse.
In summer 2012 Bosworth was awarded a 5-year European Research Council Starter Grant.

Bibliography

 Katja Aas, Mary Bosworth (2013). Borders of Punishment: Migration, Citizenship and Social Exclusion.  Oxford University Press, UK. .

References

Living people
Australian criminologists
Australian women criminologists
University of Western Australia alumni
Alumni of the University of Cambridge
Academic staff of Monash University
Fellows of St Cross College, Oxford
Australian sociologists
Australian women sociologists
Year of birth missing (living people)